Pomacentrus philippinus, the Philippine damsel, is a damselfish species described by Barton Warren Evermann and Alvin Seale in 1907. Pomacentrus philippinus is part of the genus Pomacentrus and the family Pomacentridae.

References 

philippinus